is a 2014 Japanese youth music drama film directed by Daigo Matsui. It was released on January 17, 2015.

Cast
Ai Hashimoto as Shiori Hayano 
Jun Aonami as Ayumi Kinoshita   
Yu Inaba as Kohei Kawajima 
Go Riju as Takumi Tsukiyama 
Marie Machida as Sachiko Kinoshita 
Seiko Oomori
Haruki Koketsu
Masahiro Naoe

Reception
Derek Elley of Film Business Asia gave the film a 6 out of 10 and said it "feels too long for its superficial subject matter; but taken in the right spirit it's a pleasant enough time-waster".

See also
List of lesbian, gay, bisexual or transgender-related films of 2015

References

External links
 

Japanese drama films
Films directed by Daigo Matsui
2014 drama films
2010s Japanese films